Edgar Ramos Mendes Varela (born 2 March 1996) is a Portuguese futsal player who plays as a winger for Mouvaux Lille in the French Championnat de France de Futsal and the Portugal national team.

References

External links
Sporting CP profile

1996 births
Living people
Portuguese men's futsal players
Sporting CP futsal players
Place of birth missing (living people)